Trichochrysea is a genus of leaf beetles in the subfamily Eumolpinae. It is distributed in Asia.

According to A. G. Moseyko (in 2012), the Central Asian species are significantly different from the Oriental species.

Species
The genus includes the following species:

South, East and Southeast Asian species:

 Trichochrysea aeneipennis (Lefèvre, 1890)
 Trichochrysea albopilosa Medvedev & Eroshkina, 1987
 Trichochrysea annamita (Lefèvre, 1877)
 Trichochrysea antennata Jacoby, 1908
 Trichochrysea bhamoensis (Jacoby, 1892)
 Trichochrysea bidens (Lefèvre, 1893)
 Trichochrysea borneensis (Jacoby, 1895)
 Trichochrysea brevipennis Pic, 1926
 Trichochrysea cephalotes (Lefèvre, 1893)
 Trichochrysea chejudoana Komiya, 1985
 Trichochrysea chihtuana Komiya, 1985
 Trichochrysea clypeata (Jacoby, 1889)
 Trichochrysea cupreata (Baly, 1867)
 Trichochrysea curta Pic, 1926
 Trichochrysea evanescens (Baly, 1864)
 Trichochrysea fasciata Chen, 1940
 Trichochrysea formosana Komiya, 1985
 Trichochrysea fortipunctata Lopatin, 2005
 Trichochrysea grisea Medvedev & Eroshkina, 1999
 Trichochrysea hebe (Baly, 1864)
 Trichochrysea hirta (Fabricius, 1801)
 Trichochrysea hirta hirta (Fabricius, 1801)
 Trichochrysea hirta viridis (Jacoby, 1892)
 Trichochrysea igneipennis (Lefèvre, 1890)
 Trichochrysea imperialis (Baly, 1861)
 Trichochrysea inaequalis Pic, 1927
 Trichochrysea incana Medvedev & Eroshkina, 1987
 Trichochrysea jacobyi Medvedev, 2001
 Trichochrysea japana (Motschulsky, 1858)
 Trichochrysea lameyi (Lefèvre, 1893)
 Trichochrysea lesnei (Berlioz, 1921)
 Trichochrysea mandarina (Lefèvre, 1893)
 Trichochrysea marmorata Tan, 1984
 Trichochrysea morosa (Lefèvre, 1885)
 Trichochrysea mouhoti Baly, 1861
 Trichochrysea multicolor Pic, 1926
 Trichochrysea nitidissima (Jacoby, 1888)
 Trichochrysea nitidissima nitidissima (Jacoby, 1888)
 Trichochrysea nitidissima scutellaris Pic, 1926
 Trichochrysea okinawana Nakane, 1956
 Trichochrysea okinawana meridiojaponica Komiya, 1985
 Trichochrysea okinawana okinawana Nakane, 1956
 Trichochrysea okinawana taiwana Komiya, 1985
 Trichochrysea parvula (Jacoby, 1892)
 Trichochrysea philippinensis (Baly, 1864)
 Trichochrysea purpureomaculata Jacoby, 1898
 Trichochrysea purpureonotata Pic, 1927
 Trichochrysea quadrifasciata (Jacoby, 1889)
 Trichochrysea quadrifasciata igneicollis Medvedev & Eroshkina, 1999
 Trichochrysea quadrifasciata quadrifasciata (Jacoby, 1889)
 Trichochrysea robusta Pic, 1926
 Trichochrysea rufofemoralis Jacoby, 1908
 Trichochrysea sakishimana Komiya, 1985
 Trichochrysea sericea Pic, 1926
 Trichochrysea similis Chen, 1935
 Trichochrysea sinensis Chen, 1940
 Trichochrysea singaporensis Medvedev, 2009
 Trichochrysea speciosa (Jacoby, 1896)
 Trichochrysea tarsata Achard, 1921
 Trichochrysea transversicollis Medvedev & Eroshkina, 1999
 Trichochrysea trapezicollis Medvedev & Eroshkina, 1999
 Trichochrysea truncata Medvedev & Sprecher-Uebersax, 1999
 Trichochrysea undulata Pic, 1926
 Trichochrysea variegata (Jacoby, 1889)
 Trichochrysea vestita Baly, 1861
 Trichochrysea viridilabris Heller, 1923
 Trichochrysea vitalisi (Berlioz, 1917)

Central Asian species:
 Trichochrysea amygdali (Ogloblin in Semenov & Ogloblin, 1941)
 Trichochrysea amygdali amygdali (Ogloblin in Semenov & Ogloblin, 1941)
 Trichochrysea amygdali nuratavica Lopatin, 1976
 Trichochrysea arnoldii (Medvedev, 1957)
 Trichochrysea occidentalis (Weise, 1887)

Synonyms:
 Trichochrysea bhamoensis Jacoby, 1908 (not T. bhamoensis (Jacoby, 1892)): renamed to Trichochrysea jacobyi Medvedev, 2001
 Trichochrysea celebensis (Jacoby, 1895): synonym of Trichochrysea hirta (Fabricius, 1801)
 Trichochrysea humeralis Pic, 1928: synonym of Trichochrysea cephalotes (Lefèvre, 1893)
 Trichochrysea gloriosa (Lefèvre, 1893): synonym of Trichochrysea aeneipennis (Lefèvre, 1890)
 Trichochrysea griseonotata Pic, 1936: possible synonym of Trichochrysea fasciata Chen, 1940
 Trichochrysea laosensis Pic, 1928: synonym of Trichochrysea hebe (Baly, 1864)
 Trichochrysea nitida (Jacoby, 1892): synonym of Trichochrysea clypeata (Jacoby, 1889)
 Trichochrysea severini Jacoby, 1900: synonym of Trichochrysea vestita Baly, 1861
 Trichochrysea splendida Achard, 1921: synonym of Trichochrysea hebe (Baly, 1864)
 Trichochrysea superba Pic, 1934: synonym of Trichochrysea mouhoti Baly, 1861
 Trichochrysea viridipes Pic, 1936: synonym of Trichochrysea cephalotes (Lefèvre, 1893)

References

Eumolpinae
Chrysomelidae genera
Beetles of Asia
Taxa named by Joseph Sugar Baly